Yana may refer to:

Locations
Yana, Burma, a village in Hkamti Township in Hkamti District in the Sagaing Region of northwestern Burma
Yana, India, a village in the Uttara Kannada district of Karnataka, India
Yana, Nigeria, an administrative capital in Bauchi State, Nigeria
Yana, Sierra Leone, a town in Northern Province of Sierra Leone
Yana (river), a river in Yakutia, Russia
Yana (Sea of Okhotsk), a river in Magadan Oblast, Russia
Yana Plateau, Russia
Yana Point, the point forming the west side of the entrance to Bruix Cove, Antarctica

People
Yana Korogluyeva (singer), (Born 2002) Arabic American singer
Yana Dobrovolskaya (born 1997), Miss Russia 2016
Yana Gupta (born 1979), Czech-Indian model-actress
Yana Klochkova (born 1982), Ukrainian Olympic swimmer
Yana Kudryavtseva (born 1997), Russian rhythmic gymnast
Yana Kunitskaya (born 1989), Russian mixed martial artist
Yana Marinova (born 1978), Bulgarian actress
Yana Milev (born 1969), German artist, philosopher, author and sociologist
Yana Toboso (born 1984), Japanese manga artist
Yana Tsikaridze, Canadian rhythmic gymnast
Yana Vorona (born 2004), Russian artistic gymnast
A Slavic variation of Jane (given name)
Yana, a diminutive of the Russian male first name Averky

Other
Professor Yana, a fictional character from the Doctor Who episode "Utopia"
Yana (Buddhism), a mode or method of spiritual practice in Buddhism
Yana language, an extinct language isolate
Yana people, a group of Native Americans indigenous to Northern California in the central Sierra Nevada Mountains
"Yana Yana", a single by the Lebanese pan-Arab singer Sabah

See also